Martin James McGowan Jr. (October 28, 1920 – August 13, 2009) was an American politician and newspaper editor.

Early life and education 
Born in Appleton, Minnesota, McGowan went to the University of Notre Dame from 1938 to 1941 and then received his bachelor's degree from the University of Missouri in 1942.[3]

Career 
McGowan was the editor and publisher of the Appleton Press, the Swift County Monitor-News and three other weekly newspapers in Minnesota. The Appleton Press was then a well written and well thought out small town newspaper that reported on the intimate details of local life, such as a visit by a citizen's out of town relative.  A selection of his columns spanning those newspapers relate samples of his writing.  On the occasion of his 80th birthday, he wrote a biographic article on his life growing up in a local newspaper family, his schooling, working with his father, traveling with the US Navy, and raising a family.

McGowan served on the Blue Earth County, Minnesota Planning Board and the Appleton, Minnesota Library Board. From 1959 until 1967, McGowan served in the Minnesota House of Representatives as a Democrat. His nephew Rick Nolan also served in the Minnesota Legislature and six terms in the U.S. House of Representatives. His son Martin James McGowan III graduated in Mechanical Engineering from the Massachusetts Institute of Technology in 1966. McGowan died in Minneapolis, Minnesota.

Notes

1920 births
2009 deaths
People from Appleton, Minnesota
University of Notre Dame alumni
University of Missouri alumni
Editors of Minnesota newspapers
Democratic Party members of the Minnesota House of Representatives
20th-century American politicians